Return to Olympus is the debut studio album by American rock band Malfunkshun and the only album to include both original vocalist Andrew Wood (later of Mother Love Bone) and Kevin Wood (later of Devilhead). It was released after the band had broken up and after lead singer Andrew Wood had died of a drug overdose in 1990.  Stone Gossard, of Pearl Jam, had compiled the songs and released the album on his label, Loosegroove Records.

The band covered Ted Nugent's song "Wang Dang Sweet Poontang".

Track listing
All songs written by Andrew Wood except for "Wang Dang Sweet Poontang" which was written by Ted Nugent.

 "Enter Landrew" – 2:50
 "My Only Fan" – 4:23
 "Mr. Liberty (With Morals)" – 3:25
 "Jezebel Woman" – 4:31
 "Shotgun Wedding" – 4:17
 "Wang Dang Sweet Poontang" (Ted Nugent cover) – 3:20
 "Until the Ocean" – 2:54
 "I Wanna Be Yo Daddy" – 4:56
 "Winter Bites" – 7:38
 "Make Sweet Love"/"Region" – 5:05
 "Luxury Bed (The Rocketship Chair)" – 4:58
 "Exit Landrew" - 1:50

Tracks 13-32 are empty and do not have any audio in them.

 "With Yo' Heart Not Yo' Hands (Live)" – 6:35

"Region" is hidden after track 10 "Make Sweet Love".

Personnel
 Andrew Wood -  vocals, bass
 Kevin Wood - guitars
 Regan Hagar - drums

References

Malfunkshun albums
1995 debut albums
Albums produced by Jack Endino
Loosegroove Records albums